Reigle is a surname. Notable people with the surname include:

Daniel P. Reigle (1841–1917), Union Army soldier and Medal of Honor recipient
David Reigle (born 1952), American writer
Ed Reigle (1924–2003), Canadian ice hockey player

See also
Reigle Field, airport in Lebanon County, Pennsylvania, United States